Sis (also Romanized as Sīs; also known as Siz) is a city in the Central District of Shabestar County, East Azerbaijan province, Iran. At the 2006 census, its population was 5,127 in 1,391 households. The following census in 2011 counted 5,502 people in 1,586 households. The latest census in 2016 showed a population of 6,106 people in 1,928 households.

References 

Shabestar County

Cities in East Azerbaijan Province

Populated places in East Azerbaijan Province

Populated places in Shabestar County